Al-Sahel Sports Club is a Syrian professional multi-sports club based in Tartus, mostly known for its football team that competes in the Syrian League 1st Division.

History
Club's women's basketball team competes at the top level of the Syrian basketball league. In 2018, Al-Sahel promoted to the Syrian Premier League for the first time in their history.

, 4 types of sports are being practiced by the club including: football, basketball, table tennis and bodybuilding.

, Al Sahel SC have an Independent International Supporters Club.

The home stadium of the football team is the Bassel al-Assad Stadium in Tartus.

References

Sahel
Sahel
1971 establishments in Syria